These are the official results of the Men's hammer throw event at the 1994 European Championships in Helsinki, Finland, held at Helsinki Olympic Stadium on 10 and 11 August 1994. There were a total number of 25 participating athletes.

Medalists

Abbreviations
All results shown are in metres

Records

Qualification

Group A

Group B

Final

Participation
According to an unofficial count, 25 athletes from 12 countries participated in the event.

 (3)
 (1)
 (1)
 (1)
 (2)
 (3)
 (3)
 (3)
 (1)
 (2)
 (2)
 (3)

See also
 1992 Men's Olympic Hammer Throw (Barcelona)
 1993 Men's World Championships Hammer Throw (Stuttgart)
 1994 Hammer Throw Year Ranking
 1995 Men's World Championships Hammer Throw (Gothenburg)
 1996 Men's Olympic Hammer Throw (Atlanta)

References

 Results
 hammerthrow.wz

Hammer throw
Hammer throw at the European Athletics Championships